SONOR was UCSD's Resident Contemporary Music Ensemble. Performing between 1977 and 2006, the group presented 37 concerts. Members included UCSD Faculty such as Philip Larson, Edwin Harkins, Carol Plantamura, János Négyesy, John Fonville, Robert Zelickman, Steven Schick, Charles Curtis, Aleck Karis, Peter Farrell, Bertram Turetzky as well as associates and graduate students such as Päivikki Nykter, Hugh Livingston, Susan Barrett, Ross Karre, Rob Esler, Fabio Oliveira, Gregory Stuart, Justin Dehartand, and Orin Hildestad. Conductors and Directors included Bernard Rands, Paul Dresher, Rand Steiger, Jean-Charles Francois, Thomas Nee, Jan Williams, and Keith Humble.

Discography
 Robert Erickson : Robert Erickson, Composers Recording, Inc., nwcr 616, 1991 
 Iannis Xenakis : Ais/Gendy3/Taurhiphanie/Thallein, Neuma Records, Neuma 450-86, 1994 
 Roger Reynolds : Personae/The Vanity of Words/Variation, Neuma Records, CD, Neuma 450-78, 1995

Repertoire
Adams, John
 Chamber Symphony, 1992

Argento, Dominick
 Letters from Composers, 1968

Babbitt, Milton
 Additional Correspondence, 1974–75

Balassa, S√°ndor
 Music Based on Junk Mail, Op. 18, 1969

Barkin, Elaine
 Election Pamphlet, 1982

Berg, Alban
 Four Songs, Op. 2
 Four Pieces for Clarinet and Piano, Op. 5
 Chamber Concerto for Piano and Violin and Thirteen Wind Instruments, 1925

Berio, Luciano
 Lines Sequenza III, 1966 Circles, 1961

Bharali, Arun
 Regan, 1994–95

Blaustein, Susan
 Harlequinade
 Heads! Heads!
 Harliquin

Bloom, Victor
 Quintet, 1987–88

Bolcom, William
 Lilith, 1984

Boulez, Pierre
 Drive, 1984

Boone, Charles
 The Khaju Bridge

Bozay, Attila
 Series for Chamber Ensemble, Op. 9, 1970

Brant, Henry
 Ghost Nets, 1988

Brown, Earle
 Centering

Cage, John
 Five Pieces from 26'1.1499" (solo contrabass), 1955
 Freeman Etudes, 1-XXXII (solo violin), 1977–1989
 Sonatas and Interludes (solo piano), 1946–48
 4'33" (solo piano), 1952
 Music for Four, 1984–87
 Ryoangi, 1987

Carter, Elliott
 Penthode, 1985

Chadabe, Joel
 Many Mornings - Many Moods, 1988

Cox, Frank
 Viz, 1989–91
 Di-remption (percussion solo), 1993

Cunha, Antonio
 Ancient Rhythm, 1994

Curran, Alvin
 Why Is This Night Different from All other Nights, 1992

Czernowin, Chaya
 For Arye, 1990
 Dam Sheon Hachol (The Hourglass Bleeds Still), 1992Dallapiccola, Luigi
 Due Liriche Di Anacreonte, 1946

Davidovsky, Mario
 Salvos, 1986

Davies, Paul
 Aurora Borealis, 1985

Davis, Anthony
 Lost Moon Sisters, 1992

Densiov, Edison
 Chamber Symphony

Dobrian, Chris
 Nonyx, 1986
 Now and Then, 1985

Donatoni, Franco
 Arp√ge, 1986

Dubrovay, L√°szl√≥
 Violin Concerto

Durand, Jo√©l-Fran√ßois
 Un feu distinct, 1991

Durk√≥, Zsolt
 Three English Verses, 1990–91

Eisler, Hanns
 Vierzehn Arten den Regen zu Geschreigen, Op. 7

Elliott Carter
 A Mirror on Which to Dwell, 1975

Enriquez, Manuel
 Tercia

Erb, Donald
 Views of Space and Time, 1988

Erickson, Robert
 Cradles II, 1972
 Dunbar's Delight, tympani solo, 1985
 Fives
 Kryl, 1977
 Night Music, 1978
 Nine and a Half for Henry, 1970
 The Pleiades, violin solo, violin solo, 1981
 Quintet, 1985
 Quoq, flute solo, 1978
 Ricercar √† 3, contrabass solo, 1967
 Sierra, 1984
 The Idea of Order at Key West, 1979
 Music for Trumpet, Strings and Tympani, 1990
 Taffytime, 1983

Estrada, Julio
 Three Solos

Felciano, Richard
 Shadows, 1987

Felder, David
 Inner Sky, 1993–94 Episode, 1978

Feldman, Morton
 Crippled Symmetry, (1983)
 Four Songs to e. e. cummings
 I Met Heine on the Rue Furstemberg, 1971

Ferneyhough, Brian
 Bone Alphabet (solo percussion), 1991
 Carceri d'Invenzione I, 1980–81
 Chute d'Icare, 1988
 Prometheus, 1967
 Superscriptio (solo piccolo), 1981
 Brain Terrain, 1992

Firsova, Elena
 Forest Walks Sonata, Op. 16, 1976

Fonville, John
 Mong Songs

Fran√ßois, Jean-Charles
 NOstreOS, 1987
 Obdobla, 1976
 Orbes, Aubade, 1989
 Sphyxis (T), 1991

Frank, Andrew
 . . .of silence and slow time, 1979

Gaburo, Kenneth
 Line Studies Inside: Quartet for One Double Bass Player, 1969

Gandolfi, Michael
 Personae

Gerhard, Roberto
 Libra Octet, 1967

Ginastera, Alberto
 Pampeana, No. 2

Giraud, Albert
 Songs from PIERROT LUNAIRE

Glasgow, Glenn
 New Work, 1991

Gubaidulina, Sofia
 Detto II

Gy√∂rgy Ligeti
 Chamber Concerto, 1969–70

Harrison, Lou
 Solstice, a Masque, 1946

Hiller, Lejaren
 Algorithms I, II, III, 1986–87

Hindemith, Paul
 Kammermusik No. 3, Opus 36, No. 2, 1925

Humble, Keith
 Kaleida's Cope, 1987
 Piano Sonata, No. 3, 1985

Ives, Charles
 Largo, 1902

Johnston, Ben
 Two Sonnets of Shakespeare A Sea Dirge, 1963

Kim, Earl
 Now & Then, 1981

Koonce, Paul
 Diapason Spin-Curve Foci, 1986

Korf, Anthony
 Nothing but Love Songs

Kraft, William
 Harlequinade

Krenek, Ernst
 Altendichte (1927); Wechselsahmen (1966); Spahelese (1972)
 Vier Ges√§nge Nachalten Gedichten,Op. 53

Kurt√°g, Gy√∂rgy
 Bagatelles, 1981

Lam, Bun-Ching
 Social Accidents, 1988

Lang, David
 Dance/Drop, 1988–89

L√°ng, Istv√°n
 Musica 3-4-2, 1979

Lansky, Paul
 Stroll, 1988

Lanza, Alcides
 Arghanum II, 1987

Larin, Eduardo
 Iridescence, 1980

Lavista, Mario
 Dusk Monologo, 1966

Leedy, Douglas
 Canti, 1975

Leibowitz, Rene
 Marijuana, 1959 Suite for 9 Instruments, Op. 81, 1967

Lewis, George
 Nightmare at the Best Western (a few folk songs), 1992

Lierdeman, Philippe
 Variations, Op. 5, 1993

Lifchitz, Max
 Night Voices #6, 1985

Ligeti, Gy√∂rgy
 Chamber Concerto, 1969–70

Lian, Rafael
 Dubhe, 1986

Lyon, Eric
 Splatter, 1989

Mabry, Drake
 11.10.83 (clarinet solo)

Macchia, Salvatore
 Evening Sky

Martino, Donald
 Triple Concerto, 1976–78

Martirano, Salvatore
 LON/dons, 1988

Messiaen, Olivier
 Oiseaux exotiques, 1955–56

Moe, Eric
 Kicking and Screaming, 1993–94

Moore, F. Richard
 We, 1991

Mosko, Stephen
 Schweres Loos

Mosko, Stephen
 Superluminal Connections I: "The Atu of Tahuti", 1985

Mumma, Gordon
 Faisandage et Galimafr√©e, 1984

Murail, Tristan
 Allegoresi, 1992

Nancarrow, Conlon
 Study No. 1; Study No. 5; Study No. 9
 (arranged by Ivar Mikashoff) Studies for Player PianoNono, Luigi
 Liebeslied, 1955
 Incontri, 1955Ogdon, Wilbur
 A Fantasy for Violin and Piano, 153
 A Modern? Fable, 1990
 By the Isar
 Eight Pieces for Violin and Piano, 1988–89
 Five Preludes, 1985
 Four DH Lawrence Songs, 1989
 Serenade for Wind Quintet, 1986–87
 Seven Pieces and a Capriccio, 1988
 Six Small Trios, 1982
 Summer images and Reflections, 1984-5
 Thireteen Expressions for solo violin and ensemble, 1993
 Three Baritone Songs, 1950/56
 Three Guitar Songs, 1988–89
 Three Trifles, 1957
 Two Ketchwa Songs, 1955
 Two Sea Chanteys, 1988
 Two Tonal Songs
 UnTombeau de Jean Cocteau III, 1975–76
 Winter images, 1980Oliveros, Pauline
 Portraits of SONOR, 1988
 Double Bases at Twenty PacesPayton, Leonard
 7 Apocalyptic SongsPecquet, Franck
 Archipel Brise et Retour, 1988Pousseur, Henri
 Trois Chants sacr√©s, 1954Powell, Mel
 Modules: An Intermezzo for Chamber Orchestra, 1985
 Settings for Soprano and Chamber GroupRan, Shulamit Amichai
 Songs, 1984Rands, Bernard
 Canti del Sole, 1982
 Canti Lunatici, 1980
 Memo 2bReck, David
 Night Sounds (and Dream), 1965Reich, Steve
 Eight Lines, 1987 Piano Phase, 1967Reynolds, Roger
 Archipelago, 1983
 Emperor of Ice Cream, 1962
 Less than Two, 1977–79
 Personae, 1989
 The Palace, 1980
 Transfigured Wind III, 1984
 Personae, 1990
 Not Only Night, 1988
 Vertigo, 1986Risset, Jean-Claude
 Profils, 1981-82Rose, Fran√ßois
 Lueur de Nuit (solo violin), 1993Rosenman, Leonard
 Die Estrade; AbsinthRuders, Poul
 Corpus cum Figuris, 1984Rzewski, Frederic
 Piano Sonata, 1991Saariaho, Kaija
 Io, 1986–87Sch√°ffer, Boguslaw
 Free Form No. 2/Evocazioni (solo contrabass)
 Free Form No. 3 (for contrabass and piano)Schieve, Catherine
 Tiger's Eye, 1981Schnittke, Alfred
 Hymn II
 Hymn IIISchoenberg, Arnold
 Ode to Napoleon, 1942Sculthorpe, Peter
 RequiemSessions, Roger
 From My Diary, 1947Shapey, Ralph
 De Profundis, 1960Simmons, Margo
 ObeisanceSimons, Nettie
 Wild Tales Told on the River RoadSollberger, Harvey
 Killapata/Chaskapata, 1983
 The Advancing Moment, 1993Son, Yung-Wha
 somewhere I have never travelled, 1982Stein, Leonard
 MoquerieSteiger, Rand
 Quintessence, 1981
 Double Concerto, 1986
 Woven Serenade, 1991Stevens, John
 Pentas, 1986
 Sum over HistoriesStockhausen, Karlheinz
 Kontra-Punkte
 Kreuzspiel, 1951Stokes, Eric
 The Greenhouse EffectStokes, Eric
 Four Songs for Voice and Oboe, 1962Stravinsky, Igor
 Elegie, 1944Strizich, Robert
 HydraSubotnick, Morton
 The Key to Songs, 1985Takemitsu, Toru
 Rain Coming
 Voice, 1980
 Waves, 1976
 Far Away, 1973
 Water Ways, 1977Tenney, James
 Form 3, 1993
 Three Textures from Quintext (for String Quartet and Bass), 1972
 Wake for Charles Ives, 1974
 Crystal Canon for Edgar Varese, 1974Thimmig, Les
 Sleeping Fire, 1971Torke, Michael
 Yellow Pages, 1985Tower, Joan
 Wings (solo clarinet)
 PetroushskatesVar√®se, Edgard
 Octandre, 1923
 OffrandesWebern, Anton
 Two Songs for Chorus and Instruments, Op. 19, 1926
 Five Canons on Latin Texts, Op. 16, 1923–24
 Three Songs, Op. 18, 1925
 Three Songs, Op. 25
 Four Pieces for Violin and Piano, Op. 7, 1910
 Three Small Pieces for Cello and Piano, Op. 11
 Konzert, Op. 24

Wilson, Olly
 No More, 1985

Winkler, Todd
 Cascade, 1986

Wolpe, Stefan
 Chamber Piece No. 1
 Piece for 2 Instrumental Units
 Piece in Two Parts for Flute and Piano, 1959–60
 Piece for Trumpet and Seven Instruments, 1971

Xenakis, Iannis
 Thallein, 1984
 Morsima-Amorsima, 1956–62
 N'Shima

Yin, Gan-wei
 Chuen Mian, 1985

Yuasa, Joji
 Domain, 1986 (flute solo)
 Etude for "THE", 1983
 Mutterings, 1988
 Projection for Violoncello and Piano, 1967
 Nine Levels by Ze-Ami, 1987
 Maibatariki II for alto flute, 1987
 My Blue Sky, no. 3, 1977
 Terms of Temporal Detailing [Homage to D.H.] (flute solo),1989
 Solitude, 1980
 A Winter Day: Homage to Bash√≥, 1981

Zwilich, Ellen Taaffe
 Concerto for Trumpet and Five Players, 1984

References

Musical groups from San Diego
Contemporary classical music ensembles
Musical groups established in 1977